Acanthospermum is a genus of plants in the family Asteraceae, also known as  starburrs or starburs. It was described as a genus in 1820.

Taxonomy

Species
, Plants of the World Online has 7 accepted species:
 Acanthospermum australe (Loefl.) Kuntze - South America
 Acanthospermum consobrinum S.F.Blake -  Paraguay 
 Acanthospermum glabratum (DC.) Wild. - South Africa
 Acanthospermum hispidum DC. - South America 
 Acanthospermum humile (Sw.) DC. - West Indies
Acanthospermum lecocarpoides B.L.Rob. & Greenm. - Galapagos Islands
 Acanthospermum microcarpum B.L.Rob. - Ecuador including Galápagos

References

 
Asteraceae genera